Mirnyy is a rural locality (a village) in Sudislavskoye Rural Settlement of Sudislavsky District, Kostroma Oblast, Russia. The population was 244 as of 2014. There are 7 streets.

History 
The village received this name in 1966.

References

External links 
 Mirnyy on komandirovka.ru

Rural localities in Kostroma Oblast
Populated places in Sudislavsky District